The Italy team for EuroBasket 2022 qualification will represent Italy at the EuroBasket 2022 qualification. Italy has already qualified for the EuroBasket 2022 being one of the host countries. Nevertheless, Italians won four matches and lost two, ending the competition in the first position.

Timeline
First window
 28 January 2020: submitted the long list of 24 players.
 3 February 2020: submitted the list of 16 players.
 12 February 2020: Andrea Pecchia was replaced by Matteo Tambone due to an ankle injury.
 19 February 2020: submitted list of 12 players for the match against Russia.
 20–23 February 2020 – First window
 20 February 2020: Italy 83 – 64 Russia
 23 February 2020: Estonia 81 – 67 Italy

Second window
 24 October 2020: submitted the long list.
 21 November 2020: submitted the list of 16 players.
 23 November 2020: due to light fever Paolo Banchero was excluded from the list if 16 from the team's medical staff.
 25 November 2020: chosen the final 12 players that will play in Tallinn.
 27–30 November 2020: The second window
 28 November 2020: The match against North Macedonia was postponed due to SARS-CoV-2 cases in the Macedonian team.
 30 November 2020: Russia 66 – 70 Italy

Third window
 1 February 2021: submitted long list of 24 players.
 7 February 2021: submitted the list 14 player for the Perm bubble.
 14 February 2021: Simone Zanotti replaces Leonardo Totè.
 18–21 February 2021: The third window
 18 February 2021: Italy 92-84 North Macedonia
 19 February 2021: Italy 101-105 Estonia
 21 February 2021: North Macedonia 87-78 Italy

Kit 
Supplier: Spalding / Sponsor: Barilla

Roster 
These were the players that coach Sacchetti called for the qualification in the three windows.

Notes
   Age on February 21, 2021 

Legend

Staff 

Source:

Qualification 

The draw was held on 22 July 2019 in Munich, Germany. Italy was drawn into Group B with Estonia, North Macedonia and Russia. These matches will be played in three windows from 17 to 25 February 2020; from 23 November to 1 December 2020 and from 15 to 23 February 2021 with two games played by each team in every window.

Overview

Group B 

Table

Results summary

Results by round

vs Russia 
Leonardo Totè had incurred in an injury on the right eye the same day of the match and, because of the FIBA regulation, he couldn't be replaced.

@ Estonia

vs North Macedonia 
Because of the COVID-19 pandemic the matches of the second window against North Macedonia and Russia have been arranged to be played behind closed doors, in the protected bubble of the Saku Suurhall in Tallinn.

But the first of the two matches against North Macedonia that was initially scheduled to be played on November 28, was postponed  because three Macedonian players were found positive to SARS-CoV-2. The FIBA Medical Commission was forced to defer the game. The match was finally played in the third window on 18 February 2021 in the Perm bubble in Russia.

@ Russia

vs Estonia 
The third and last window, together with the postponed game against North Macedonia, was played in the Perm bubble in Russia in order to limit the exposure to the COVID-19 pandemic. All games were played behind closed doors.

@ North Macedonia

Statistics

Individual statistics

Individual game highs 

Notes
  at least 5 attempts
  match ended in overtime

Team game highs 

Notes
  match ended in overtime

See also 
 EuroBasket 2022 qualification

References

External links

Italy Qualifiers Profile at the FIBA Website

2020
2021
EuroBasket 2022